Erilusa is a genus of moths of the family Crambidae.

Species
Erilusa croceipes C. Felder, R. Felder & Rogenhofer, 1875
Erilusa leucoplagalis (Hampson, 1899)
Erilusa secta

Former species
Erilusa nitealis C. Felder, R. Felder & Rogenhofer, 1875

References

Spilomelinae
Crambidae genera
Taxa named by Francis Walker (entomologist)